Joseph Thaddeus Hudson (born May 21, 1991) is an American professional baseball catcher in the Atlanta Braves organization. He previously played for the Los Angeles Angels, St. Louis Cardinals, and Seattle Mariners of Major League Baseball (MLB).

Career
Hudson attended Jesuit High School in Tampa, Florida, and the University of Notre Dame, where he played college baseball for the Notre Dame Fighting Irish.

Cincinnati Reds
The Cincinnati Reds selected Hudson in the sixth round of the 2012 MLB draft. He was assigned to the Billings Mustangs for 2012. In 2013, he played for the Dayton Dragons, and played for the team in 2014 as well. Hudson was invited to Spring Training for the 2016 season, but did not make the club and was assigned to the Pensacola Blue Wahoos. Hudson was invited to Spring Training for the 2018 season, but once again did not make the club and was reassigned to the Louisville Bats.

Los Angeles Angels
On June 30, 2018, the Reds traded Hudson to the Angels for cash considerations. The Angels promoted him to the major leagues on September 4. Hudson was designated for assignment on October 26, 2018 and he became a free agent on November 2.

St. Louis Cardinals
On November 13, 2018, Hudson signed a minor league deal with the St. Louis Cardinals. On September 1, 2019, the Cardinals selected Hudson's contract. Hudson was outrighted off the Cardinals roster on November 1, and elected free agency on November 4.

Seattle Mariners
On January 22, 2020, Hudson signed a minor league contract with the Seattle Mariners. For the Mariners in 2020, Hudson appeared in 9 games, going 3-for-17 with 2 walks and 5 strikeouts in 20 plate appearances. He was outrighted to Triple-A Tacoma following the 2020 season. On October 19, it was announced that he elected free agency.

Pittsburgh Pirates
On January 25, 2021, Hudson signed a minor league contract with the Pittsburgh Pirates organization and was invited to Spring Training. Hudson spent the 2021 season with the Triple-A Indianapolis Indians. He played in 47 games for Indianapolis, hitting .188 with 3 home runs and 18 RBI's. On October 1, Hudson was released by the Pirates.

Tampa Bay Rays
On March 11, 2022, Hudson signed a minor league contract with the Tampa Bay Rays. He elected free agency on November 10, 2022.

Atlanta Braves
On December 5, 2022, Hudson signed a minor league contract with the Atlanta Braves.

References

External links

Living people
1991 births
Baseball players from Tampa, Florida
Major League Baseball catchers
Los Angeles Angels players
St. Louis Cardinals players
Seattle Mariners players
Notre Dame Fighting Irish baseball players
Dayton Dragons players
Bakersfield Blaze players
Daytona Tortugas players
Pensacola Blue Wahoos players
Louisville Bats players
Salt Lake Bees players
Mobile BayBears players
Memphis Redbirds players
Jesuit High School (Tampa) alumni
Indianapolis Indians players